The honey badger is a small mammal.

Honey Badger or honey badger may also refer to:

Arts and entertainment
 Honey Badger (Glee) or Terri Schuester, a character on Glee
 Honey Badger or Gabby Kinney, a character related to X-23 in Marvel Comics
 The Honey Badger, a novel by Robert Ruark
 "Honey Badger", an episode of the television show Survivor: Caramoan

People with the nickname
 Nick Cummins (born 1987), Australian rugby union player
 Brad Marchand (born 1988), Canadian ice hockey player
 Tyrann Mathieu (born 1992), American football player
 Daniel Ricciardo (born 1989), Australian Formula One driver

Other uses
 Honey badger (men's rights), a female men's rights activist
 AAC Honey Badger, a rifle based on the AR-15
 Hamilton Honey Badgers, a Canadian professional basketball team
 Laredo Honey Badgers, an American professional indoor soccer team
 Operation Honey Badger, an operation of the US intelligence to spy China uncovered in 2010
 Project Honey Badger within Operation Credible Sport, a project by the US military

See also
 The Crazy Nastyass Honey Badger, a YouTube viral video and Internet meme

Lists of people by nickname